Reiko Sato (December 19, 1931 – May 28, 1981) was an American dancer and actress.

Early life
Sato was born in Los Angeles, California, to an issei Zen Buddhist priest, Ken-ichi Sato and his wife Chieko. She and her family were interned at the Gila River War Relocation Center during World War II following the signing of Executive Order 9066. Her mother became a real estate investor after the war; Reiko also had an older brother, Keiichiro, and a younger brother, Koji. She graduated from Belmont High School in 1949, later attending Los Angeles City College. She continued her studies in ballet.

Career
Sato is best known for playing seamstress Helen Chao in the 1961 feature film Flower Drum Song. She also had a dramatic role in The Ugly American, receiving personal coaching from actor Marlon Brando with whom she had a relationship. She had been on contract with Fox and Universal, but nothing materialized, and she retired from Hollywood.

She had performed as the original Princess of Ababu in the Broadway production of Kismet, as well as the movie. In 1955, she played the female lead of Lotus Blossom in the second national tour of John Patrick's play The Teahouse of the August Moon opposite Larry Parks. She was also in the Broadway play, Destry Rides Again, having two roles. Sato was scheduled to return to Broadway as part of a 1966 musical Chu Chem, but its chaotic Philadelphia tryout led to the production being cancelled before reaching New York.

She participated in regional theater as well, performing in the Valentina Oumansky Dramatic Dance Ensemble on September 24, 1970, in Hilo, Hawaii.

Final years
Sato spent her final years involved in various organizations promoting equality for Asian-American performers. She lived on Mulholland Drive. She died of a  brain aneurysm on May 28, 1981. Half of her ashes were sent to a Buddhist temple. The other half were "spirited away" to Marlon Brando's private island. Her authorized biography, Reiko Sato by Samuel Clemens, was published on February 4, 2022.

Filmography

References

External links

1931 births
1981 deaths
Actresses from Los Angeles
American film actresses
American stage actresses
Japanese-American internees
Belmont High School (Los Angeles) alumni
20th-century American actresses
20th-century American singers
American actresses of Japanese descent
American film actors of Asian descent
American dancers of Asian descent
20th-century American dancers